The 1990 October Revolution Parade was the last parade commemorating the 1917 October Revolution during the Soviet Union's existence. It celebrated the 73rd anniversary of the revolution.

Description and particularities 
It was first and last parade attended by Mikhail Gorbachev in his position as President of the Soviet Union. Among those present were Nikolai Ryzhkov, Anatoly Lukyanov, Boris Yeltsin (first president of the Russian Federation), and Gavriil Popov. At the chimes of the Kremlin Clock, Gorbachev gave an address to the nation. It would be the second and last time a Soviet leader made an address on Lenin's Mausoleum during an October Revolution Day parade. It is the only Soviet parade when the inspection of troops are held after the President's speech and anthem, in contrast to the previous parades which the inspection of troops begin, followed by speech by the parade inspector and anthem, besides one of the few parades when the emblems of the Soviet Republics are not in display on the Red Square other than the 1990 Victory Day Parade, most possibly due to independence of Lithuania and Latvia (including Estonia although independence yet to be declared, but had changed its emblem, flag and official name to Republic of Estonia). After the anthem was played, the commander of the parade Colonel General Nikolai Kalinin reported to the parade inspector Marshal of the Soviet Union Dmitry Yazov. The parade of 1990 was the last military parade to feature military equipment, a sight that would not be seen until the 2008 Moscow Victory Day Parade 18 years later. Providing the music for the parade was the Massed Bands of the Moscow Military District, led by the director of the Military Band Service of the Armed Forces of the Soviet Union, Major General Nikolai Mikhailov. It is also the only parade when the Soviet leadership on the grandstand moved down from the grandstand to lead the civilian demonstration after the military parade.

Full order of the march past 
At the front of the parade was the limousine carrying the commander of the parade, Colonel General Nikolai Kalinin.

Massed Bands
 Corps of Drums of the Moscow Military Music College
 Massed Military Bands of the Moscow Military District

Ground Column
 Frunze Military Academy
 V. I. Lenin Military Political Academy
 Felix Dzerzhinsky Engineering Academy
 Military Armored Forces Academy Marshal Rodion Malinovskovy
 Military Academy of Chemical Defense and Control
 Yuri Gagarin Air Force Academy
 Prof. Nikolai Zhukovsky Air Force Engineering Academy
 Naval Engineering School
 98th Guards Airborne Division
 Moscow Border Guards Institute of the Border Defence Forces of the KGB "Moscow City Council"
 336th Marine Brigade
 OMSDON regiment
 Suvorov Military Academy
 Nakhimov Naval School
 Moscow Military High Command Training School "Supreme Soviet of the Russian SFSR"

Mobile Column
 2nd Guards Tamanskaya Motorized Rifle Division
BTR-80
 BMP-2
 98th Guards Airborne Division
 BMD-2
 4th Guards Kantermirovsky Tank Division
T-80
 Rocket Forces and Artillery
 2S3 Akatsiya
 2S19 Msta
 BM-21 Grad

Parades in other cities of the USSR 
Revolution Day parades and celebrations were also held in many Soviet republics and cities of the Russian Soviet Federative Socialist Republic. For the first time in Soviet history, the traditional 7 November parade in Kyiv, the capital city of the Ukrainian SSR, was the only event held on the holiday, with the parade location in Kyiv was changed from Khreshchatyk Street to Victory Square (Ploshcha Peremohy) by order of the Kyiv City Council. It was also limited to a one-hour parade from 9 to 10 am. No full-size tanks were displayed at the parade. The parade was also the last one held in many republics, including the Tajik SSR and the Uzbek SSR.

On the other hand, the Revolution Day parade in the Lithuanian capital of Vilnius, was held contrary to parliamentary decree banning military parades "without a permit". The parade on Gediminas Avenue, which began at 10 am local time and had been rehearsed for over a week, marched past the Lithuanian Parliament to the Lenin Monument, where several thousand a rally of pro-Soviet demonstrators was held, with many demonstrators being bused in from outside of Lithuania. Chairman of the Supreme Council Vytautas Landsbergis and Prime Minister Kazimira Prunskienė both condemned the military parade as "psychological warfare" and an attempt by the Soviet authorities to "intimidate" breakaway republic. A similar situation occurred in the Latvian capital of Riga, where on 10 October the Supreme Council and the Riga City Executive Committee had announced that Gorbachev's decree on organizing military parades in local cities was not binding in Latvia.

Attempted assassination of Gorbachev 

At 11:00 AM, an hour after the parade began, an attempt to kill President Gorbachev was made by Alexander Shmonov. The two bullets he fired missed and he was tackled to the ground by crowds of demonstrators. Shmonov was the last would-be-assassin of the Soviet period before the USSR's dissolution in 1991. He was sent to forced treatment which took a heavy toll on his mental state. Three weeks prior to the parade, Shmonov bought a double-barreled hunting rifle. At the parade, Shmonov took out his rifle and was spotted immediately by the militsiya, and as he was taking aim, an officer ran over and jerked the rifle by the barrel as the crowd jumped on him. Soviet Central television did not broadcast the assassination attempt and resumed its regular broadcasting at 11:25 AM.

Notes

References

External links

October Revolution Parade
October Revolution parades
November 1990 events in Europe
1990 in Moscow
Last events
1990 in the Soviet Union